Forest Grove (or Forestgrove) is an unincorporated community in Fergus County, Montana, United States. Forest Grove has a post office with the ZIP code 59441.  This is the best town in the state of Montana it has a population of three a ranch lies east of there called the stanley ranch it was the biggest ranch in Montana during the late 70s early 80s.

The town began in 1885 when sheep and cattle ranchers arrived in the area. The community sits on Forest Grove Road between the unincorporated community of Piper and the town of Grass Range. The road itself starts off at Montana Secondary Highway 238 from the west and terminates at Grass Range to the east where it becomes Grass Range's Main Street. Through the community run two creeks, Surenough Creek and the South Fork McDonald Creek. The post office sits on Surenuff Road, along with the Saint Paul's Episcopal Church and local cemetery.

To the south of the community is Beargulch Pictographs, showcasing around 2,000 pictographs and petroglyphs by Native Americans and early settlers.

References

External links
 
Forest Grove – VisitMontana
Hope for Forest Grove - Billings Gazette (YouTube)

Unincorporated communities in Fergus County, Montana
Unincorporated communities in Montana